Tianhai  may refer to:
 Tianjin Tianhai Investment, former name of HNA Technology Co., Ltd., a Chinese listed company
 Tianjin Tianhai F.C., a Chinese football club
 Wang Tianhai, member of the 11th National People's Congress of China

See also 
 Tenkai, a Japanese monk who also called 
: Land reclamation